The Commissioner for the British Antarctic Territory (BAT), is the head of government in the Antarctic Territory of the United Kingdom. As one of the British Overseas Territories, the commissioner is appointed by the monarch of the United Kingdom on the advice of the Foreign and Commonwealth Office.

The British Antarctic Territory was established as a separate British overseas territory in 1962. Originally from 1962 to 1990, a High Commissioner was appointed to oversee the territory who was also Governor of the Falkland Islands. In 1990, administration of the BAT was transferred to a Commissioner based in London.

Since 1998, the Commissioner of the BAT has also served as Commissioner of the British Indian Ocean Territory.

Prior to 1962, the area was a part of the Falkland Islands Dependencies and as such was administered by the Governor of the Falkland Islands

This is a list of High Commissioners and Commissioners of the British Antarctic Territory (BAT), the area of Antarctica claimed by the United Kingdom.

High Commissioners
(also Governors of the Falkland Islands)

Edwin Porter Arrowsmith (1962–1964)
Cosmo Dugal Patrick Thomas Haskard (1964–1970)
Ernest Gordon Lewis (1971–1975)
Neville Arthur Irwin French (1975–1977)
James Roland Walter Parker (1977–1980)
Rex Masterman Hunt (1980–1985)
Gordon Wesley Jewkes (1985–1988)
William H. Fullerton (1988–1990)

Commissioners
(non-resident; based in London)
Merrick Stuart Baker-Bates (1990–1992)
P. Newton (1992–1995)
Anthony Longrigg (1995–1997)
John White (1997–2001)
Alan Huckle (2001–2004)
Tony Crombie (2004–2006)
Leigh Turner (2006–2008)
Colin Roberts (2008–2012)
Peter Hayes (2012–2016)
John Kittmer (2016–2017)
Ben Merrick (2017–2021)
Paul Candler (2021–present)

See also

British Antarctic Territory

References
World Statesmen: British Antarctic Territory. Accessed 4 April 2007.  

Commissioners of the British Antarctic Territory
Antarctic Territory